The Mauna Kea Ice Age Natural Area Reserve is a  Hawaii state natural reserve that includes the Mauna Kea Adz Quarry, on the southern slope of Mauna Kea on the island of the Hawaii.

Location
At , the Mauna Kea access road leads to the north at about  elevation. The road was unofficially named for John A. Burns who was Governor of Hawaii when it was built in 1964.
The land is part of the Natural Area Reserves System administered by the Hawaiʻi Department of Land and Natural Resources.
The  reserve was established in 1981.

In 1998, the area leased to the Mauna Kea Observatory (called the Kea Science Reserve) was modified to exclude the Ice Age reserve. 
A 2004 study found the rare wēkiu bug (Nysius wekiuicola) in the reserve.

Quarry
The quarry was used by prehistoric Hawaiians to obtain basalt for stone tools including blades for adzes. 
Located near the summit of Mauna Kea at an elevation above  at  along the Mauna Kea Trail, this is the largest primitive quarry in the world. The archaeological complex also includes religious shrines, trails, rock shelters, and petroglyphs. The Hawaiian language name for the quarry was Keanakākoi.

On December 29, 1962, the quarry was added to the list of National Historic Landmarks in Hawaii.
On October 15, 1966 it was added to the National Register of Historic Places listings on the island of Hawaii as site 66000285.
On May 21, 1981 it was added to the state register as site 10-23-4136.

Lake Waiau is located even further up the trail within the reserve.

See also
List of National Historic Landmarks in Hawaii

References

Quarries in the United States
Protected areas of Hawaii (island)
Glaciology of the United States
Nature reserves in Hawaii
Protected areas established in 1981
1981 establishments in Hawaii
National Register of Historic Places in Hawaii County, Hawaii
National Historic Landmarks in Hawaii